Gerard Vyacheslavovich Vasilyev (born 24 September 1935 in Tersko-Orlovsky Mayak, Leningrad Oblast) is a Soviet and Russian singer and actor, People's Artist of the RSFSR, President of the Foundation for the Conservation and Development of the operetta genre, president of competition for young artists of operetta OperettaLand.

Biography 
In 1967, Vasilyev graduated from the Leningrad State Conservatory vocal class and was accepted into the troupe of the Novosibirsk Theatre of Operetta, where for eight months of the six played a major role. In 1968, he was invited as a soloist at the Moscow Operetta Theater, where he works now.

Roles in movies 
1975 —  Maiden Planner as Yuri Tokmokov, clerk
1975 —   The Count of Luxembourg as Rene von Luxemburg
1976 —   Silva-Csardas Princess 
1977 —   Espanyola or Lope de Vega suggested... 
1979 —   Hanna ringleaders  as Count Danilo

Awards 
Honored Artist of the RSFSR (1974)
People's Artist of the RSFSR (1981)
 Order of Friendship (1995) —  for services to the state, and many years of fruitful work in the field of art and culture
 Order of Honour (2001) —  for many years of fruitful work in the field of culture and art, a great contribution to strengthening friendship and cooperation between the peoples
 Medal "For Strengthening Military Cooperation" (2003) —  for his merits in strengthening military cooperation, active involvement in the military-patriotic education of youth
 Order "For Merit to the Fatherland", 3rd class
 Order "For Merit to the Fatherland",  4th class

References

External links
 Gerard.ru
 Биография

1935 births
Living people
People from Murmansk Oblast
Soviet male stage actors
Russian male stage actors
Soviet male singers
20th-century Russian male actors
21st-century Russian male actors
20th-century Russian singers
21st-century Russian singers
Recipients of the Order "For Merit to the Fatherland", 3rd class
Recipients of the Order of Honour (Russia)
People's Artists of the RSFSR
Honored Artists of the RSFSR
Baritones
Saint Petersburg Conservatory alumni
Russian music educators
Soviet music educators
20th-century Russian male singers
21st-century Russian male singers
Recipients of the Order "For Merit to the Fatherland", 4th class